Kiến Phúc (12 February 1869 – 31 July 1884) was a child emperor of Vietnam, who reigned for less than 8 months, 1883–1884, as the 7th emperor of the Nguyễn dynasty.

Biography
Born in 1869, also known as Nguyễn Phúc Ưng Đăng, he was the nephew-turned-adopted son of Emperor Tự Đức. He reigned for 7 months and 29 days (2 December 1883 – 31 July 1884).

Along with his cousin Dục Đức and brother Đồng Khánh, he had been taken in by Tự Đức who was unable to have children of his own. After the regicide of Emperor Hiệp Hoà, the court regents Tôn Thất Thuyết and Nguyễn Văn Tường acted quickly to install the fifteen-year-old prince as the new Emperor. Kiến Phúc was quickly enthroned on 1 December 1883 at five o'clock in the morning.

Emperor Kiến Phúc was often hampered by poor health and died in Kiến Thành Palace on July 31, 1884 – less than 8 months after ascending the throne. His sudden death sparked rumors that the Emperor was poisoned by his adoptive mother, Tự Đức's Noble Consort Học phi and regent Nguyễn Văn Tường for he knew of their secret affair.

References

External links 

 
 

1868 births
1884 deaths
Child monarchs from Asia
Emperors of Nguyen Vietnam
Nguyen dynasty emperors
Monarchs who died as children
19th-century Vietnamese monarchs
Vietnamese monarchs